This article contains an overview of the year 1981 in athletics.

International events
Asian Championships
Central American and Caribbean Championships
European Indoor Championships
South American Championships
Universiade
World Cross Country Championships

Men's Best Year Performers

100 metres

200 metres

400 metres

800 metres

1,500 metres

Mile

3,000 metres

5,000 metres

10,000 metres

Half Marathon

Marathon

110m Hurdles

400m Hurdles

3,000m Steeplechase

High Jump

Long Jump

Triple Jump

Discus

Hammer

Shot Put

Pole Vault

Javelin (old design)

Decathlon

Women's Best Year Performers

100 metres

200 metres

400 metres

800 metres

1,500 metres

Mile

3,000 metres

5,000 metres

10,000 metres

Marathon

100m Hurdles

400m Hurdles

High Jump

Long Jump

Discus

Shot Put

Javelin (old design)

Heptathlon

Births

January
January 8 – Mesías Zapata, Ecuadorian race walker
January 14 – Hyleas Fountain, American heptathlete
January 18 – Naoyuki Daigo, Japanese high jumper
January 24 – Jong Yong-Ok, North Korean long-distance runner
January 27 – Fabrizio Schembri, Italian triple jumper
January 29 – Rose Richmond, American long jumper

February
February 12 – Amarilys Alméstica, Puerto Rican hammer thrower
February 13 – Rosibel García, Colombian middle-distance runner
February 15 – Rita Jeptoo, Kenyan marathon runner
February 16 – Jessé de Lima, Brazilian high jumper
February 17 – Shi Na, Chinese race walker
February 19 – Shellene Williams, Jamaican sprinter
February 25 – Marek Plawgo, Polish athlete

March
March 11 – Yelena Konevtseva, Russian hammer thrower
March 13 – Stefan Wenk, German javelin thrower
March 22 – Aliaksandr Parkhomenka, Belarusian decathlete
March 28 – Yuniel Hernández, Cuban hurdler

April
April 13 – Moushaumi Robinson, American sprinter
April 19 – Kazuhiro Maeda, Japanese long-distance runner

May
May 6 – Rui Pedro Silva, Portuguese distance runner
May 15 – Merja Korpela, Finnish hammer thrower
May 20 – Jana Tucholke, German discus thrower
May 21 – Anna Rogowska, Polish pole vaulter
May 28 – Kamil Kalka, Polish  race walker
May 31 – Eileen O'Keefe, Irish hammer thrower

July
July 9 – Rutger Smith, Dutch discus thrower and shot putter
July 13 – Ineta Radēviča, Latvian long and triple jumper
July 24 – Carys Parry, Welsh hammer thrower
July 30 – Daria Onyśko, Polish sprinter

August
August 15 – Yoshiko Fujinaga, Japanese long-distance runner
August 30 – Aleksandr Vashchyla, Belarusian hammer thrower

September
September 6 – Brandon Simpson, Jamaican athlete
September 7 – Eyerusalem Kuma, Ethiopian distance runner
September 12 – Greg Nixon, American sprinter
September 15 – Tomas Intas, Lithuanian javelin thrower

October
October 3 – Anna Omarova, Russian shot putter
October 18 – Ji Young-Jun, South Korean long-distance runner

November
November 8 – Jéssica Augusto, Portuguese long-distance runner
November 18 – Kimberly Barrett, Jamaica-Puerto Rican shot putter
November 21 – Werknesh Kidane, Ethiopian long-distance runner

December
December 8 – Gabriel Ortiz, Mexican race walker
December 22 – Marina Kuptsova, Russian high jumper

Deaths
April 25 – Paul Bontemps (76), French long-distance runner (b. 1902)
August 2 – Delfo Cabrera (62), Argentine long-distance runner (b. 1919)

References

 Year Lists
 Association of Road Racing Statisticians
 Year Rankings

 
In Athletics (Track And Field), 1981
Athletics (track and field) by year